Tyrannodoris nikolasi is a species  of sea slug, a polycerid nudibranch, a marine gastropod mollusc in the family Polyceridae.

Distribution
This species was described from Vanuatu and Malaysia.

Description
Tyrannodoris nikolasi is a predominantly dark green animal with light green to yellow horizontal stripes or more continuous superficial pigment. The gills and rhinophores are dark blue or violet. It reaches approximately 15 mm in length. Like other nudibranchs in the genus Tyrannodoris, it is carnivorous, feeding on other seaslugs.

References

Polyceridae
Gastropods described in 2014